Carex montis-eeka, the Molokai sedge, is a species of flowering plant in the family Cyperaceae, native to Hawaii. There it is found in bogs.

References

montis-eeka
Endemic flora of Hawaii
Plants described in 1888